English Idyll is an album recorded by the cellist Julian Lloyd Webber in 1994 for Philips.

Track listing
 Romanza from Tuba Concerto by Vaughan Williams (arr. the composer)
 Romance op.62 by Elgar
 Une Idylle op.4 No.1 by Elgar
 Caprice by Frederick Delius
 Elegy by Frederick Delius
 Youthful Rapture by Grainger
 Fantasy for cello and orchestra by Dyson world (premiere recording)
 The Holy Boy by Ireland
 Solemn Melody by Walford Davies
 Brigg Fair by Grainger
 Invocation by Holst
 Pastoral and Reel by Cyril Scott

Academy of St Martin-in-the-Fields / Sir Neville Marriner
Philips CD 442 530-2

1995

External links
 English Idyll- reviews of the album

1995 albums
Julian Lloyd Webber albums